Les Steckel (born July 1, 1946) is an American football coach currently serving as the quarterbacks coach at Centre College. He was the third head coach of the Minnesota Vikings in 1984, and he has also worked as an assistant coach with the San Francisco 49ers, New England Patriots, Denver Broncos, Houston Oilers/Tennessee Titans, Buffalo Bills and Tampa Bay Buccaneers.

Early years
Steckel was born in Whitehall, Pennsylvania and attended the University of Kansas, where he was a Golden Gloves boxing champion and graduated in 1968 with a triple degree in social work, human relations, and political science. He volunteered on the Robert F. Kennedy presidential campaign that year with Rosey Grier.

He then enlisted in the Marines and served in Vietnam as infantry. He retired from the Marine Reserves after thirty years of service with the rank of Colonel.

After his return from Vietnam in 1970, Steckel was stationed in Quantico, Virginia, where he played football for the Quantico Marines football team until 1971. He joined the USMC Reserves in 1972.

Coaching career
Steckel then worked as an assistant football coach at the University of Colorado from 1973 to 1976. He was an assistant at Navy in 1977, then an assistant with the San Francisco 49ers in 1978.

Steckel joined the Minnesota Vikings coaching staff as the receivers coach in 1979 and remained an assistant coach through the 1983 season. He was promoted to head coach of the Vikings for the 1984 season after longtime coach Bud Grant retired. As a coach with a military background, Steckel emphasized discipline. He was fired after one season, in which the team posted a 3–13 record. He was succeeded by Grant, who briefly came out of retirement to fill the post.

He later worked as an assistant coach or coordinator with the New England Patriots from 1985 to 1988, then with Brown University in 1989, followed by another two years at the University of Colorado from 1991 to 1992. He returned to the NFL with the Denver Broncos from 1993 to 1994, followed by five years with the Houston Oilers/Tennessee Titans, where he helped lead them to Super Bowl XXXIV as Offensive Coordinator. In a surprise move, Steckel left the Titans just three weeks later to become Offensive Coordinator of Tampa Bay Buccaneers in 2000. The result was the Bucs' highest-scoring season ever, a 10–6 record, and a trip to the playoffs. Despite his transformation of the team's offense, Steckel's drill sergeant approach to coaching was a poor fit for the Tampa Bay franchise. Less than one year on the job, he was fired after the Bucs lost 21–3 to the Philadelphia Eagles in the NFC Wild Card Game. His final year of professional coaching was with the Buffalo Bills in 2003. He became president of the Fellowship of Christian Athletes on March 1, 2005 after taking time off to coach his son's high school team. During his one year of coaching at the high school, the team won the Tennessee state high school championship.

In January 2021, Steckel joined the coaching staff at Centre College, in Danville, Kentucky, as the team's quarterbacks coach.

Personal life
He is married to the former Chris Picket and they have three children - Lesley, a graduate of Baylor University; Luke, who played football at Princeton University and is currently the tight ends coach for the Tennessee Titans; and Christian, also a Baylor graduate, is a reporter and host for Bally Sports Southwest. Les's brother, Dave Steckel, is the former head coach of the Missouri State Bears football team and previously served under Gary Pinkel at Missouri. Dave most notably served as the defensive coordinator for the team when they won back-to-back SEC East championships in 2013 and 2014.

Head coaching record

References

1946 births
Living people
Colorado Buffaloes football coaches
Denver Broncos coaches
Houston Oilers coaches
Kansas Jayhawks football players
Minnesota Vikings coaches
Minnesota Vikings head coaches
New England Patriots coaches
San Francisco 49ers coaches
Tennessee Titans coaches
Tampa Bay Buccaneers coaches
Quantico Marines Devil Dogs football players
National Football League offensive coordinators
United States Marine Corps colonels
Players of American football from Pennsylvania
Leaders of the Fellowship of Christian Athletes
United States Marine Corps reservists
United States Marine Corps personnel of the Vietnam War
Centre Colonels football coaches